Fish in the Air is a 1948 picture book written and illustrated by Kurt Wiese. The book takes place in China and tells the story of a boy named Fish who is blown into the air after buying a kite. The book was a recipient of a 1949 Caldecott Honor for its illustrations.

References

1948 children's books
American picture books
Caldecott Honor-winning works
Viking Press books
Picture books by Kurt Wiese
Children's books about China
Children's fiction books
Books about kite flying